Maria Nikolaevna Boyko (born 15 February 1997) is a Russian singer who became famous from YouTube and TikTok.

Career 

In 2019, she started working with T-killah. In 2021, she released her debut album "".

In May 2022, the Russian Forbes in its "30 under 30" rating placed Mia Boyko as 25 as one of the winners in the "Music" category.

Discography

External links 

 Mia Boyka on YouTube

References 

1997 births
Living people
Russian TikTokers
Russian YouTubers
Plekhanov Russian University of Economics alumni

Russian pop singers
21st-century Russian singers
21st-century Russian women singers